The 2006 German Grand Prix (officially the Formula 1 Grosser Mobil 1 Preis von Deutschland 2006) was a Formula One motor race held at the Hockenheimring on 30 July 2006. The 67-lap race was the twelfth round of the 2006 Formula One season and was won by Michael Schumacher. The Grand Prix weekend got off to a controversial start when the mass damper system fitted by Renault was deemed legal by the FIA appointed stewards, despite the FIA banning the use of these devices. The FIA appealed against the steward's decision, Renault withdrew the system after Friday practice to avoid further sanctions.

Kimi Räikkönen took pole position, it proved artificial as McLaren had inadvertently not put enough fuel as intended in his car before qualifying. In the race, Räikkönen's early pitstop left him unable to challenge at the front, and the way was left clear for Ferrari to score a dominant one-two. Perhaps due to the damper issue, Renault were not competitive; it was the first time in  that neither of their cars finished the race on the podium.

Sakon Yamamoto made his Formula One début at the Grand Prix, starting from pit lane after changing chassis after the qualifying session. He was not the only one to suffer changes after qualifying, as Jarno Trulli and Christijan Albers both had to change engines, incurring ten-place penalties. A nightmare weekend for Albers was summed up with his disqualification, along with team-mate Tiago Monteiro, as the Midlands were disqualified after the race for having illegally flexing rear wings. The race also saw the last appearance by  champion Jacques Villeneuve, who blamed the split on the "lack of assurances about his short-term future with BMW Sauber". Robert Kubica was promoted internally at BMW to drive at the Hungaroring because Villeneuve was still recovering from the after-effects of his crash in Germany, and went on to race in all the remaining Grands Prix.

Friday drivers 
The bottom 6 teams in the 2005 Constructors' Championship and Super Aguri were entitled to run a third car in free practice on Friday. These drivers drove on Friday but did not compete in qualifying or the race.

Classification

Qualifying

Notes
  – Jarno Trulli qualified 13th but dropped ten places on the starting grid due to an engine change to his Toyota.
  – Christijan Albers qualified 18th but dropped ten places on the starting grid due to an engine change to his MF1.
  – Sakon Yamamoto started the race from the pit lane after changing the chassis of his Super Aguri after qualifying.

Race

Notes
  – Christijan Albers and Tiago Monteiro were disqualified for having illegally flexing rear wings.

Championship standings after the race

Drivers' Championship standings

Constructors' Championship standings

 Note: Only the top five positions are included for both sets of standings.
 Bold text indicates competitors who still had a theoretical chance of becoming World Champion.

See also 
 2006 Hockenheimring GP2 Series round

References

External links

 Detailed German Grand Prix results (archived)

German Grand Prix
German Grand Prix
Grand Prix
July 2006 sports events in Europe